James Henry Bloomfield (15 February 1934 – 3 April 1983) was an English football player and manager. He made nearly 500 appearances in the Football League, including more than 300 in the First Division with Arsenal, Birmingham City and West Ham United. He was capped by England at under-23 level. He then spent 13 years in management with Orient and Leicester City.

Life and career
Bloomfield was born in Notting Hill, North Kensington, London. His younger brother Billy was also a professional footballer with Brentford, and a nephew, Ray Bloomfield, featured for Arsenal's youth team and for a brief period for Aston Villa's first team before moving on to play soccer in America.

He began his career as a youngster with non-league club Hayes, and had a short spell with Walthamstow Avenue, before joining Second Division club Brentford in October 1952. After Brentford were relegated in 1954, Bloomfield was snapped up by Arsenal for £8,000 as a replacement for Jimmy Logie.

Bloomfield made his debut at the start of the season, against Everton on 25 August 1954, though he only played 19 times that season, and it was not until 1955–56 did he become a first-team regular. A powerful inside forward with a high work rate and accurate passing, Bloomfield was part of Arsenal's attack from 1955 to 1960, one of Arsenal's few stars during a mediocre period for the club. He won caps for England at under-23 level, but never at full level, and for the Football League XI, and also played in the London XI that lost the first Inter-Cities Fairs Cup final against Barcelona in 1958.

Bloomfield played 227 times for Arsenal, scoring 56 goals. However, with the arrival of George Eastham in 1960, Bloomfield lost his place in the team, and was sold to Birmingham City in November that year. Bloomfield spent four seasons with the Blues, reaching and losing another Fairs Cup final in 1961 (this time to Roma). He helped Birmingham win the 1963 League Cup, scoring a goal in the final itself as Birmingham overcame local rivals Aston Villa. In the summer of 1964 he returned to Brentford, and later had spells with West Ham United, Plymouth Argyle and Orient.

In 1968, he became Orient's player-manager, and won the Third Division in his second full season, 1969–70, He was appointed by newly promoted Leicester City in 1971, and kept the Foxes in the First Division for six years. They also reached the FA Cup semi-finals in 1973–74, which they lost, after a replay, to Liverpool. During his six-year stint at Leicester, Bloomfield created a side of free-flowing skilful football on a shoe-string budget, featuring the likes of Frank Worthington, Keith Weller and Len Glover, and he is still considered one of the club's all-time great if not greatest manager. He left the club in 1977, and they were relegated the following season.

Bloomfield returned to manage Orient again in 1977, and his second spell in charge included a run to the FA Cup semi-finals in 1977–78, in which they were defeated by his old club Arsenal. He left in 1981 following a dispute with the club chairman, Brian Winston, over the sale of Nigerian international winger John Chiedozie. In a 2014 Football League poll, Bloomfield was voted Orient's best ever manager. After leaving Orient, he was a coach at Luton Town until his sudden death in Chingford, Essex, in 1983, from cancer at the age of 49.

Honours

Player
Birmingham City
League Cup: 1962–63

Manager
Orient
Football League Third Division: 1969–70

Leicester City
FA Charity Shield: 1971

Individual
 Football League Third Division Manager of the Year: 1969–70

References

1934 births
1983 deaths
Footballers from Kensington
Association football inside forwards
English footballers
England under-23 international footballers
Hayes F.C. players
Walthamstow Avenue F.C. players
Brentford F.C. players
Arsenal F.C. players
Birmingham City F.C. players
West Ham United F.C. players
Plymouth Argyle F.C. players
Leyton Orient F.C. players
English Football League players
London XI players
English Football League representative players
English football managers
Leyton Orient F.C. managers
Leicester City F.C. managers
English Football League managers
Luton Town F.C. non-playing staff
Deaths from cancer in England